Dolores Walshe (born 1949), is an Irish short story writer, novelist and playwright.

Biography
Dolores Walshe was born in Dublin and grew up in the Liberties in the inner city. She graduated with a degree in Arts from University College Dublin and then got a Higher Diploma from Trinity College, Dublin.

She has won grants, bursaries and awards for her story- and play-writing. Walshe was awarded a second Arts Council Bursary in Literature 2014.  She has won a number of fiction awards including the Bryan MacMahon Short Story Award in 2012 and the James Joyce Jerusalem Bloomsday Award. She has come 2nd in the Francis MacManus Award twice. In 2017 she won the Berlin Writing Prize. Walshe has also won a number of awards as a playwright, such as the Listowel Writers’ Week Play Award and Irish Stage and Screen Award and in 1987 she won the OZ Whitehead/Society of Irish Playwrights/PEN Playwriting Literary Prize. Walshe was also winner of the 1991 Irish Stage and Screen Playwriting Competition.

Walshe's plays have been produced by The Royal Exchange in Manchester and the Andrew’s Lane Theatre in Dublin, and she has been published by Carysfort Press, UCD, and Syracuse University, New York.

Her work deals with themes like race, feminism and poverty.

She currently lives in Carrick-on-Shannon, Leitrim.

Bibliography
 A Country in Our Heads
 In the Talking Dark
  Moon Mad, 1993
  Where the Trees Weep, 1992

References and sources

1949 births
Writers from Dublin (city)
Alumni of University College Dublin
Alumni of Trinity College Dublin
Irish women novelists
Irish women short story writers
Irish women dramatists and playwrights
20th-century Irish novelists
20th-century Irish short story writers
20th-century Irish dramatists and playwrights
20th-century Irish women writers
Living people